Levomethorphan (LVM) (INN, BAN) is an opioid analgesic of the morphinan family that has never been marketed. It is the L-stereoisomer of racemethorphan (methorphan). The effects of the two isomers of racemethorphan are quite different, with dextromethorphan (DXM) being an antitussive at low doses and a dissociative hallucinogen at much higher doses. Levomethorphan is about five times stronger than morphine. 

Levomethorphan is a prodrug to levorphanol, analogously to DXM acting as a prodrug to dextrorphan or codeine behaving as a prodrug to morphine. As such, levomethorphan has similar effects to levorphanol but is less potent as it must be demethylated to the active form by liver enzymes before being able to produce its effects. As a prodrug of levorphanol, levomethorphan functions as a potent agonist of all three of the opioid receptors, μ, κ (κ1 and κ3 but notably not κ2), and δ, as an NMDA receptor antagonist, and as a serotonin-norepinephrine reuptake inhibitor. Via activation of the kappa opioid receptor, levomethorphan can produce dysphoria and psychotomimetic effects such as dissociation and hallucinations.

Levomethorphan is listed under the Single Convention on Narcotic Drugs 1961 and is regulated like morphine in most countries. In the United States it is a Schedule II Narcotic controlled substance with a DEA ACSCN of 9210 and a 2014 annual aggregate manufacturing quota of 195 grams, up from 6 grams the year before. The salts in use are the tartrate (free base conversion ratio 0.644) and hydrobromide (0.958). At the current time, no levomethorphan pharmaceuticals are marketed in the United States.

See also 
 Butorphanol
 Cyclorphan
 Levallorphan
 Levorphanol
 Nalbuphine
 Oxilorphan
 Proxorphan
 Racemorphan
 Xorphanol

References 

Delta-opioid receptor agonists
Dissociative drugs
Enantiopure drugs
GABA receptor antagonists
Glycine receptor antagonists
Kappa-opioid receptor agonists
NMDA receptor antagonists
Morphinans
Mu-opioid receptor agonists
Nociceptin receptor agonists
Phenol ethers
Prodrugs
Semisynthetic opioids
Serotonin–norepinephrine reuptake inhibitors